Spruce Mountain may refer to:

Spruce Mountain (Arizona), in the Bradshaw Mountains
Spruce Mountain (Colorado), a summit of Colorado
Spruce Mountain (Maine), a ski slope in Jay, Maine
Spruce Mountain (Nevada)
Spruce Mountain (New York), in Saratoga County
Spruce Mountain (Delaware County, New York)
Spruce Mountain (Wells, New York), in Hamilton County
Spruce Mountain (Vermont) in Plainfield, Vermont
Spruce Mountain (West Virginia), with the highest point (Spruce Knob) in the state and in the Alleghenies

See also
Sprucemont, Nevada, a ghost town near Spruce Mountain